was a stable of sumo wrestlers, part of the Isegahama ichimon or group of stables. It had a long history. It closed its doors in January 2015, and its staff and wrestlers transferred to other stables.

History
In its active period, Asahiyama stable was one of the oldest continually-running stables in sumo, dating back to 1896. At the time of its closing it was the only stable still in existence that could trace its lineage back directly to the days of the once-rival Osaka sumo organization where it had a strong base, producing the 28th yokozuna Ōnishiki Daigorō in 1918. During the 1970s the stable was home to six Tongan wrestlers (including Sione Vailahi and Tonga Fifita) recruited by former maegashira , but when he died in 1975 they were caught up in a succession dispute between former maegashira  and the man who eventually became the new head, former komusubi Wakafutase. They sided with Futaseyama's widow, who preferred Ryūō to take over, and were ultimately dismissed by the Japan Sumo Association. As a result of the controversy sumo officials had to fly to Tonga to explain themselves to the country's king, Tāufaʻāhau Tupou IV. Wakafutase led the stable until his death in 1997. He was succeeded by former  ōzeki Daiju.

When Daiju reached retirement age in 2015 with no clear successor, the stable was closed. A number of staff and coaches and all of the active wrestlers (all being in the unsalaried divisions) transferred to Isegahama stable (the head stable of the same ichimon), while all other remaining staff transferred to Asakayama stable.

Ring name conventions
Many wrestlers in the later years at this stable took ring names or shikona that began with the character 大 (read: dai), meaning large, in deference to their coach and the stable's owner, the former Daiju.

Owner
1896-1916: 11th Asahiyama Shirōemon  (former maegashira Iwagatani)
1916-1918: 12th Asahiyama Daigorō (the 28th yokozuna Ōnishiki)
1918-1943: 13th Asahiyama Shirōemon (former ōzeki Futasegawa)
1943-1959: 14th Asahiyama Shirōemon (former sekiwake Futasegawa)
1959-1963: 15th Asahiyama Shirōemon (former sekiwake )
1963-1975: 16th Asahiyama Shōgo (former maegashira )
1975-1997: 17th Asahiyama Tadayuki (former komusubi Wakafutase)
1997-2015: 18th Asahiyama Toshiaki (yakuin taigu iin, former ōzeki Daiju)

Notable members
Kōtetsuyama (former sekiwake)
Daihishō (former maegashira)
Daimanazuru (former maegashira)
  (former maegashira)
Tokusegawa (former maegashira)
Oniarashi (best rank jūryō)

Coach
Kiriyama Kuniyuki (iin, former komusubi Kurosegawa)

Assistants
Shiraiwa Masatoshi (wakaimonogashira, former jūryō, real name Masatoshi Satō)
Saisu Minoru (sewanin, former maegashira, real name Minoru Saisu)

Ushers
Hideo (tate yobidashi, real name Hidehito Yamaki)
Kōji (jūryō yobidashi, real name Takuma Hatano)

Former hairdressers
Tokoyodo (first class tokoyama)
Tokosei (second class tokoyama)

See also
List of sumo stables
List of active sumo wrestlers
List of past sumo wrestlers
Glossary of sumo terms

References

External links
Japan Sumo Association profile

Defunct sumo stables